The list of shipwrecks in 1968 includes ships sunk, foundered, grounded, or otherwise lost during 1968.

January

1 January

3 January

7 January

9 January

11 January

13 January

14 January

15 January

16 January

18 January

22 January

23 January

26 January

27 January

February

4 February

5 February

6 February

10 February

13 February

15 February

18 February

19 February

20 February

22 February

25 February

26 February

27 February

29 February

March

1 March

3 March

6 March

8 March

9 March

10 March

14 March

20 March

23 March

29 March

April

7 April

9 April

10 April

12 April

21 April

22 April

30 April

Unknown date

May

6 May

10 May

17 May

21 May

28 May

June

3 June

14 June

17 June

29 June

30 June

July

5 July

9 July

19 July

23 July

August

3 August

5 August

9 August

13 August

14 August

16 August

17 August

20 August

21 August

22 August

23 August

27 August

31 August

Unknown date

September

1 September

5 September

8 September

9 September

10 September

16 September

23 September

27 September

29 September

October

1 October

5 October

10 October

15 October

16 October

19 October

21 October

31 October

November

3 November

7 November

11 November

15 November

24 November

28 November

December

7 December

8 December

12 December

19 December

21 December

22 December

24 December

Unknown date

Unknown date

References

1968
 
Ships